Shutterbug may refer to:

 Shutterbug (magazine), a camera equipment magazine; see Faces of Sunset Boulevard
 Shutterbug Follies, a 2002 graphic novel created by Jason Little
 A song by the band Veruca Salt on the album Eight Arms to Hold You
 "The Shutterbug", an episode of the children's animated television series Timothy Goes to School
 Shutterbug, a 1995 album by Thousand Foot Krutch
 "Shutterbugs", several episodes on the MTV sketch comedy show Human Giant
 Shutterbugs, a Canadian educational animated series broadcast by TVOKids

See also
"Shutterbugg", a song by Big Boi on the album Sir Lucious Left Foot: The Son of Chico Dusty